3 Amigonauts (aka The 3 Amigonauts and The Three Amigonauts) is a Canadian animated television series created by Kyle Marshall and developed by Laurie Elliott and Terry McGurrin. The series debuted on YTV on August 5, 2017, and aired new episodes through September 28, 2017.

Premise
The show centers on three 13-year-old incompetent anthropomorphic dinosaurs named Herby, Kirbie, and Burt who are hailed as heroes after saving Earth from annihilation. The series takes place in Earth's far-flung future.

Characters

The eponymous 3 Amigonauts
Burt (Doug Hadders) – the one with a head and torso as one solid mass with brown hair. He is of medium height.
Herby (Annick Obonsawin) – the one with blue hair and a head bigger than his torso. He is the shortest of the three.
Kirbie (Julie Sype) – the tallest and sole female of the three. She has green hair.

Others

Woody (Deven Mack) – the school van who speaks to the Amigonauts through a radio.
Colonel Cork (Jesse Buck)
President Skillsworthy (John Stocker)
Professor Mybad (Evan Taggart)
Donnie (Cory Doran) – the trio's arch nemesis.
Betty Soo (Stacey DePass)
The Donnettes (Amy Matysio) – Donnie's fangirls.

Episodes

Broadcast and release
The series aired on YTV from August 5, 2017 to September 28, 2017. As of December 2017, the show no longer aired on YTV. It aired on Pop and Pop Max in the UK and in Africa. The series is available on Tubi in the United States. The show currently airs reruns on Nickelodeon Canada

The series premiered in the United Kingdom on November 1, 2018 on Pop and Pop Max.

International versions

References

External links

2010s Canadian animated television series
2017 Canadian television series debuts
2017 Canadian television series endings
Canadian children's animated comic science fiction television series
Canadian flash animated television series
English-language television shows
YTV (Canadian TV channel) original programming
Television series by 9 Story Media Group
Television series set in the future
Television series created by Kyle Marshall
Animated television series about dinosaurs